The John W. Boone House, also known as the Stuart P. Parker Funeral Home, is a historic home located at Columbia, Missouri. It was built about 1890, and is a two-story frame house that measures roughly 46 feet by 45 feet. It was the home of ragtime musician John William 'Blind' Boone.  The home, which is owned by the City of Columbia, had fallen into a state of severe disrepair, but is now under restoration 

It was listed on the National Register of Historic Places in 1980.

References

Houses on the National Register of Historic Places in Missouri
Houses completed in 1890
Houses in Columbia, Missouri
National Register of Historic Places in Columbia, Missouri
National Register of Historic Places in Boone County, Missouri
African-American history in Columbia, Missouri
African-American history of Missouri